Memorial Hospital is a St. Louis MetroLink station. It is located under an overpass on Frank Scott Parkway and serves Memorial Hospital (for which it is named) and the northern neighborhoods of Belleville, Illinois. The station is popular with commuters and features 431 park and ride spaces across three parking lots.

The Memorial Hospital station has a connection to the St. Clair County Transit District's 14 mile (22.5 km) MetroBikeLink shared-use path system.

Station layout

References

External links 
 St. Louis Metro
Frank Scott Parkway entrance from Google Maps Street View

St. Clair County Transit District
MetroLink stations in St. Clair County, Illinois
Railway stations in the United States opened in 2001
Red Line (St. Louis MetroLink)